"Step Out of Hell" is a song and single made by the German power metal band Helloween taken from the album Chameleon. The song is written by Roland Grapow about Ingo Schwichtenberg's problems with drugs and drinking.
This single has the same b-sides as the single "Windmill", and the same cover. "Windmill" was released in Europe and "Step Out of Hell" in Japan.

Single track listing

Personnel
Michael Kiske - vocals
Roland Grapow - lead and rhythm guitars
Michael Weikath - lead and rhythm guitars
Markus Grosskopf - bass guitar
Ingo Schwichtenberg - drums

References

1993 songs
1993 singles
Helloween songs
Songs written by Michael Kiske
EMI Records singles
German hard rock songs